The LG G series was a line of Android devices produced by LG Electronics. The "G" designation was first introduced in 2012 as a branch of the LG Optimus series for flagship devices, but LG announced in July 2013 that the "Optimus" name would be discontinued for future flagships in favor of maintaining "G" and "Vu" as distinct brands. The first purely G-branded phone, the LG G2, was unveiled in August 2013.

LG's first two smartwatches, the LG G Watch and the LG G Watch R, were also part of the LG G series. Starting with the LG Watch Urbane, LG dropped the "G" branding from the device's name, thus eliminating the watches from the G series.

In April 2020, LG announced that it would discontinue the G branding and return to using distinct brand names for future flagship devices (beginning with the LG Velvet), to "resonate with today's consumers and help us to establish a clearer brand identity."

Phones

2012: LG Optimus G

2013 lineup 
 LG Optimus G Pro
 LG G2
 LG G Pro Lite
 LG G2 Mini
 LG G Flex
 LG G Pro 2

2014 lineup 
 LG G3
 LG G3 Stylus
 LG G3 S, also known as LG G3 Beat, LG G3 Mini and LG G3 Vigor (AT&T, Sprint)
 LG G Pro 2
 LG Gx
 LG G Vista

2015 lineup 
 LG G4
 LG G4c, also known as the LG Magna
 LG G4 Stylus, also known in the U.S. as the LG G Stylo (Boost Mobile, Cricket Wireless, MetroPCS, Sprint, T-Mobile, Virgin Mobile)
 LG G4 Beat
 LG G4 Vigor, (Virgin Mobile Canada)
 LG G Flex 2
 LG G Vista 2

2016 lineup 
 LG G5
 LG G5 SE
 LG Stylus 2 
 LG Stylus 2 Plus

2017 lineup 
 LG G6
 LG G6+
 LG Stylus 3 
 LG Stylo 3 Plus

2018 lineup  
 LG G7 ThinQ
 LG G7 One
 LG G7 Fit
 LG Stylo 4 
 LG Stylo 4 Plus

2019 lineup 
LG G8 ThinQ
LG G8s ThinQ
LG G8x ThinQ

2020-2021 lineup 
LG Velvet
LG Velvet 2 Pro
LG Stylo 6

Tablets 
 LG G Pad 7.0
 LG G Pad 8.0
 LG G Pad 8.3
 LG G Pad 10.1

Watches 
LG has produced a number of smartwatches; however, only a few of them carry the "LG G" branding. For example, the LG G Watch R is part of the LG G series, while its successor, the LG Watch Urbane, does not carry the "G" branding.

LG G Watch 

LG and Google announced the Android Wear-based LG G Watch on June 25, 2014.

 Display: 1.65" LCD display with 280x280 pixel resolution
 Processor: Qualcomm Snapdragon 400
 Storage: 4 GB
 RAM: 512 MB

LG G Watch R 

LG and Google announced the LG G Watch R, also based on Android Wear, on October 25, 2014.

 Display: 1.3" circular P-OLED display with 320x320 pixel resolution
 Processor: Qualcomm Snapdragon 400
 Storage: 4 GB
 RAM: 512 MB

See also 
 LG K series
 LG Q series
 LG V series
 List of LG mobile phones

Notes 
 The LG Stylus 2 is the first and, as of late 2018, the last smartphone with a built-in DAB+ digital radio.

References 

G series
Android (operating system) devices